Stan Shuatuk is a populated place situated in Pima County, Arizona, United States, just north of the international border with Mexico. Historically, it has also been known as Cervantis Well, La Moralita, Molinitos, Molinton, Molonitos, and Serventi Well. In 1941, the name officially became Stan Shuatuk through a decision by the Board on Geographic Names. The name request came through a request by the Bureau of Indian Affairs, who stated that Stan Shuatuk was "used and understood by the residents and Papagos (Tohono O'odham) in general." In O'odham, stan shuatuk means "hot water".

Notes

References

Populated places in Pima County, Arizona